SQL/JRT, or SQL Routines and Types for the Java Programming Language, is an extension to the SQL standard first published as ISO/IEC 9075-13:2002 (part 13 of SQL:1999). SQL/JRT specifies the ability to invoke static Java methods as routines from within SQL applications, commonly referred to as "Java stored procedures". SQL/JRT also calls for the ability to use Java classes as SQL structured user-defined types. The two parts of the extension originate from the earlier ANSI SQLJ part 1 and 2 standards (not to be confused with SQLJ part 0, which defined an embedding of SQL into Java, later standardized by ISO as SQL/OLB.)

Example
SQL/JRT allows a Java function to be called from SQL code like this:
CREATE FUNCTION sinh(v DOUBLE) RETURNS DOUBLE
  LANGUAGE JAVA DETERMINISTIC NO SQL
  EXTERNAL NAME 'CLASSPATH:java.lang.Math.sinh'

SELECT sinh(doublecolumn) FROM mytable

SQL/JRT also allows Java code to dynamically generate tables using a java.sql.ResultSet object. The result sets returned are converted to SQL tables and can be used anywhere a table or view can be used.

Implementations 

SQL/JRT stored procedures are implemented in HSQLDB. Java stored procedures have also been implemented in Oracle's JServer (or Aurora JVM), which was introduced in the Oracle Database version 8i in 1999; it is now called Oracle JVM. IBM DB2 also supported Java stored procedures since about 1998, although using an external JVM (at that time).

See also
SQL:2003

References

External links
SQL:2003 SQL/JRT draft
SQL:2003 SQL Standard User Defined Types and Routines from the Farrago documentation

SQL